Thelxiope is a genus of Cambrian and Ordovician arthropod. Four named species are known, the type species T. palaeothalassia is known from the Burgess Shale, Canada T. holmani is from the Wheeler Shale of Utah, Thelxiope tangi from the Linyi Lagerstätte of Shandong, China, and T. spinosa, which is known from both the Linyi Lagerstätte and the Wheeler Shale. An indeterminate species is also known from the Ordovician (Floian) Fezouata Formation in Morocco. It is a member of Mollisoniida, alongside close relatives Mollisonia, Corcorania and Urokodia. They are suggested to be stem-chelicerates.

References

Burgess Shale fossils
Prehistoric arthropod genera

Cambrian genus extinctions